Giuseppe Loretz (4 May 1860 – 14 January 1944) was an Italian cyclist. He was the first winner of the Italian National Road Race Championships in 1885, and finished second in 1886.

References

External links

1860 births
1944 deaths
Italian male cyclists
Cyclists from Milan